Naples is the third biggest city in Italy and 10th-most populous urban area in the European Union and 2nd in Italy. The Metropolitan City counts more than 3 millions inhabitants and is the third in Italy. As for the number of buildings above , Naples has a 7th place in the European Union. Most skyscrapers are office buildings.

Tallest buildings
The list includes buildings (above ) in the city of Naples and its metropolitan area.

See also

List of tallest buildings in Italy

External links 

 Emporis.com report for Naples
 Skyscraperpage.com report for Naples

Tallest buildings
Naples